
Year 139 BC was a year of the pre-Julian Roman calendar. At the time it was known as the Year of the Consulship of Piso and Laenas (or, less frequently, year 615 Ab urbe condita) and the Second Year of Jianyuan. The denomination 139 BC for this year has been used since the early medieval period, when the Anno Domini calendar era became the prevalent method in Europe for naming years.

Events 
 By place 
 China 
 Emperor Wu of Han sends the diplomat Zhang Qian west to form an alliance with the Yuezhi against the Xiongnu. Wu does this after learning from Xiongnu defectors that the Xiongnu had defeated and killed the king of the Yuezhi, had expelled the Yuezhi from their lands and were using their king's skull as a wine goblet. The Yuezhi had subsequently migrated further west. 
 Soon after his departure for the west, Zhang Qian is detained by Junchen Chanyu of the Xiongnu. He would remain in Xiongnu custody for more than ten years and would be given a Xiongnu wife.
 Wei Zifu enters Emperor Wu's palace as a concubine and becomes pregnant. Enraged, Liu Piao, the mother of the childless Empress Chen Jiao (wife of Emperor Wu), kidnaps Zifu's brother Wei Qing, who is rescued by Gongsun Ao. Wu responds by advancing the careers of members of the Wei family.

 Roman Republic 
 The Lusitanian War ends when the rebellion collapses after the assassination of Viriathus by a Roman agent.
 The Achaean League is reestablished.

 By topic 
 Astronomy 
 Hipparchus makes a very precise determination of the length of the synodic month.

Deaths 
 Viriathus, Lusitanian leader (assassinated)

References